Miladinovci is a village in the Ilinden Municipality of North Macedonia.

Demographics
As of the 2021 census, Miladinovci had 1,272 residents with the following ethnic composition:
Macedonians 1,101
Roma 70
Persons for whom data are taken from administrative sources 56
Serbs 31
Others 14

According to the 2002 census, the village had a total of 1,276 inhabitants. Ethnic groups in the village include:
Macedonians 1,159
Turks 2
Serbs 34
Romani 62
Others 19

References

Villages in Ilinden Municipality